Maurice Bedel (Paris, 30 December 1883 – Thuré (Vienne), 15 October 1954) was a French novelist and essayist.

He was awarded with the prix Goncourt in 1927 for Jérôme 60° latitude nord. He was elected in 1948 as president of the Société des gens de lettres.

Works 

  (1927)
  (1928)
  (1930)
  (1929)
  (1931)
  (1932)
  (1933)
  (1932)
  (1934)
  (1935)
  (1935)
  (1935)
  (1936)
  (1936)
  (1937)
  (1937)
  (1937)
  (1937)
  (1943)
  (1946)
  (1948)
  (1950)
  (1951)
  (1953)
  (1953)

References 

1883 births
1954 deaths
Writers from Paris
20th-century French novelists
20th-century French male writers
Prix Goncourt winners
French male essayists
French male novelists
20th-century French essayists